Yoo Jung-nam (also Yu Jeong-nam, ; born 12 September 1983) is a South Korean swimmer, who specialized in butterfly events. He represented his nation South Korea at the 2008 Summer Olympics, and has won a career total of four medals (one silver and three bronze) in a major international competition, spanning the 2002 Asian Games and the 2005 East Asian Games. Yoo is also a member of the swimming team and a graduate of physical education at Seoul National University.

Yoo competed for the South Korean swimming team in the men's 200 m butterfly at the 2008 Summer Olympics in Beijing. Leading up to the Games, he topped the field with a time of 2:00.77 to make the FINA B-cut at the Dong-A Swimming Championships in Ulsan. Rallying from sixth at the 150-metre turn in heat two, Yoo put in a late surge on the final lap to edge out the frontrunners Douglas Lennox-Silva of Puerto Rico and Vladan Marković of Serbia by almost a full-body length for the fourth spot in 2:01.00. Yoo failed to advance into the semifinals, as he placed thirty-fourth out of 44 swimmers in the prelims.

References

External links
NBC 2008 Olympics profile

1983 births
Living people
South Korean male freestyle swimmers
Olympic swimmers of South Korea
Swimmers at the 2002 Asian Games
Swimmers at the 2008 Summer Olympics
Asian Games medalists in swimming
South Korean male butterfly swimmers
Sportspeople from Busan
Asian Games bronze medalists for South Korea
Medalists at the 2002 Asian Games
21st-century South Korean people